Mir Zafarullah Khan Zehri is a Pakistani politician who was a Member of the Provincial Assembly of Balochistan, from 2008 to May 2018.

Early life and education

He was born on 6 September 1975 in Karachi.

He has a degree in Bachelor of Arts.

He is brother of Nawab Sanaullah Khan Zehri and Israr Ullah Zehri.

Political career
He was elected to the Provincial Assembly of Balochistan as a candidate of Balochistan National Party Awami (BNAP) from Constituency PB-37 Kalat in 2008 Pakistani general election.

He was re-elected to the Provincial Assembly of Balochistan as a candidate of BNAP from Constituency PB-37 Kalat-II in 2013 Pakistani general election.

References

Living people
Balochistan MPAs 2013–2018
1975 births
Balochistan MPAs 2008–2013